Lev Davidovich Landau (22 January 1908 – 1 April 1968) was a Soviet physicist who made fundamental contributions to many areas of theoretical physics.

His accomplishments include the independent co-discovery of the density matrix method in quantum mechanics (alongside John von Neumann), the quantum mechanical theory of diamagnetism, the theory of superfluidity, the theory of second-order phase transitions, the Ginzburg–Landau theory of superconductivity, the theory of Fermi liquids, the explanation of Landau damping in plasma physics, the Landau pole in quantum electrodynamics, the two-component theory of neutrinos, and Landau's equations for S matrix singularities. He received the 1962 Nobel Prize in Physics for his development of a mathematical theory of superfluidity that accounts for the properties of liquid helium II at a temperature below .

Life

Early years

Landau was born on 22 January 1908 to Jewish parents in Baku, the Russian Empire, in what is now Azerbaijan. Landau's father, David Lvovich Landau, was an engineer with the local oil industry, and his mother, Lyubov Veniaminovna Garkavi-Landau, was a doctor. Both came to Baku from Mogilev and both graduated the Mogilev gymnasium. He learned differential calculus at age 12 and integral calculus at age 13. Landau graduated in 1920 at age 13 from gymnasium. His parents considered him too young to attend university, so for a year he attended the Baku Economical Technical School. In 1922, at age 14, he matriculated at the Baku State University, studying in two departments simultaneously: the Departments of Physics and Mathematics, and the Department of Chemistry. Subsequently, he ceased studying chemistry, but remained interested in the field throughout his life.

Leningrad and Europe
In 1924, he moved to the main centre of Soviet physics at the time: the Physics Department of Leningrad State University, where he dedicated himself to the study of theoretical physics, graduating in 1927. Landau subsequently enrolled for post-graduate studies at the Leningrad Physico-Technical Institute where he eventually received a doctorate in Physical and Mathematical Sciences in 1934. Landau got his first chance to travel abroad during the period 1929–1931, on a Soviet government—People's Commissariat for Education—travelling fellowship supplemented by a Rockefeller Foundation fellowship. By that time he was fluent in German and French and could communicate in English. He later improved his English and learned Danish.

After brief stays in Göttingen and Leipzig, he went to Copenhagen on 8 April 1930 to work at the Niels Bohr's Institute for Theoretical Physics. He stayed there until 3 May of the same year. After the visit, Landau always considered himself a pupil of Niels Bohr and Landau's approach to physics was greatly influenced by Bohr. After his stay in Copenhagen, he visited Cambridge (mid-1930), where he worked with Paul Dirac, Copenhagen (September to November 1930), and Zurich (December 1930 to January 1931), where he worked with Wolfgang Pauli. From Zurich Landau went back to Copenhagen for the third time and stayed there from 25 February until 19 March 1931 before returning to Leningrad the same year.

National Scientific Center Kharkiv Institute of Physics and Technology, Kharkiv
Between 1932 and 1937, Landau headed the Department of Theoretical Physics at the National Scientific Center Kharkiv Institute of Physics and Technology, and he lectured at the University of Kharkiv and the Kharkiv Polytechnic Institute. Apart from his theoretical accomplishments, Landau was the principal founder of a great tradition of theoretical physics in Kharkiv, Ukraine, sometimes referred to as the "Landau school". In Kharkiv, he and his friend and former student, Evgeny Lifshitz, began writing the Course of Theoretical Physics, ten volumes that together span the whole of the subject and are still widely used as graduate-level physics texts. During the Great Purge, Landau was investigated within the UPTI Affair in Kharkiv, but he managed to leave for Moscow to take up a new post.

Landau developed a famous comprehensive exam called the "Theoretical Minimum" which students were expected to pass before admission to the school. The exam covered all aspects of theoretical physics, and between 1934 and 1961 only 43 candidates passed, but those who did later became quite notable theoretical physicists.

In 1932, Landau computed the Chandrasekhar limit; however, he did not apply it to white dwarf stars.

Institute for Physical Problems, Moscow

From 1937 until 1962, Landau was the head of the Theoretical Division at the Institute for Physical Problems.

On 27 April 1938, Landau was arrested for a leaflet which compared Stalinism to German Nazism and Italian Fascism. He was held in the NKVD's Lubyanka prison until his release, on 29 April 1939, after Pyotr Kapitsa, an experimental low-temperature physicist and the founder and head of the institute, wrote a letter to Joseph Stalin in which he personally vouched for Landau's behaviour and threatened to quit the institute if Landau was not released.  After his release, Landau discovered how to explain Kapitsa's superfluidity using sound waves, or phonons, and a new excitation called a roton.

Landau led a team of mathematicians supporting Soviet atomic and hydrogen bomb development. He calculated the dynamics of the first Soviet thermonuclear bomb, including predicting the yield. For this work Landau received the Stalin Prize in 1949 and 1953, and was awarded the title "Hero of Socialist Labour" in 1954.

Landau's students included Lev Pitaevskii, Alexei Abrikosov, Aleksandr Akhiezer, Igor Dzyaloshinskii, Evgeny Lifshitz, Lev Gor'kov, Isaak Khalatnikov, Roald Sagdeev and Isaak Pomeranchuk.

Scientific achievements
Landau's accomplishments include the independent co-discovery of the density matrix method in quantum mechanics (alongside John von Neumann), the quantum mechanical theory of diamagnetism, the theory of superfluidity, the theory of second-order phase transitions, the Ginzburg–Landau theory of superconductivity, the theory of Fermi liquids, the explanation of Landau damping in plasma physics, the Landau pole in quantum electrodynamics, the two-component theory of neutrinos, the explanation of flame instability (the Darrieus-Landau instability), and Landau's equations for S matrix singularities.

Landau received the 1962 Nobel Prize in Physics for his development of a mathematical theory of superfluidity that accounts for the properties of liquid helium II at a temperature below 2.17 K (−270.98 °C)."

Personal life and views
In 1937, Landau married Kora T. Drobanzeva from Kharkiv. Their son Igor (1946–2011) became a theoretical physicist. Lev Landau believed in "free love" rather than monogamy and encouraged his wife and his students to practise "free love". However, his wife was not enthusiastic.

Landau was an atheist. In 1957, a lengthy report to the CPSU Central Committee by the KGB recorded Landau's views on the 1956 Hungarian Uprising, Vladimir Lenin and what he termed "red fascism". Hendrik Casimir recalls him as a passionate communist, emboldened by his revolutionary ideology. Landau's drive in establishing Soviet science was in part due to his devotion to socialism. In 1935 he published a piece entitled “Bourgeoisie and Contemporary Physics” in the Soviet newspaper Izvestia in which he criticized religious superstition and the dominance of capital, which he saw as bourgeois tendencies, citing “unprecedented opportunities for the development of physics in our country, provided by the Party and the government.”

Last years
On 7 January 1962, Landau's car collided with an oncoming truck. He was severely injured and spent two months in a coma. Although Landau recovered in many ways, his scientific creativity was destroyed,  and he never returned fully to scientific work. His injuries prevented him from accepting the 1962 Nobel Prize for physics in person.

Throughout his life Landau was known for his sharp humour, as illustrated by the following dialogue with a psychologist, Alexander Luria, who tried to test for possible brain damage while Landau was recovering from the car crash:
Luria: "Please draw me a circle"
Landau draws a cross
Luria: "Hm, now draw me a cross"
Landau draws a circle
Luria: "Landau, why don't you do what I ask?"
Landau: "If I did, you might come to think I've become mentally retarded".

In 1965 former students and co-workers of Landau founded the Landau Institute for Theoretical Physics, located in the town of Chernogolovka near Moscow, and led for the following three decades by Isaak Markovich Khalatnikov.

In June 1965, Lev Landau and Yevsei Liberman published a letter in the New York Times, stating that as Soviet Jews they opposed U.S. intervention on behalf of the Student Struggle for Soviet Jewry. However, there are doubts that Landau authored this letter.

Death
Landau died on 1 April 1968, aged 60, from complications of the injuries sustained in the car accident he was involved in six years earlier. He was buried at the Novodevichy cemetery.

Fields of contribution 

DLVO theory
Fermi liquid theory
Quasiparticle
Ivanenko–Landau–Kähler equation
Landau damping 
Landau distribution 
Landau gauge 
Landau kinetic equation
Landau pole 
Landau susceptibility
Landau potential
Landau quantization
Landau theory
Landau–Squire jet
Landau–Levich problem
Landau–Hopf theory of turbulence
Ginzburg–Landau theory
Darrieus–Landau instability
Landau–Lifshitz aeroacoustic equation
Landau–Raychaudhuri equation
Landau–Zener formula
Landau–Lifshitz model
Landau–Lifshitz pseudotensor
Landau–Lifshitz–Gilbert equation
Landau–Pomeranchuk–Migdal effect
Landau–Yang theorem
Landau principle
Stuart–Landau equation
Superfluidity
Superconductivity

Pedagogy

Course of Theoretical Physics

Legacy

Two celestial objects are named in his honour:
the minor planet 2142 Landau.
the lunar crater Landau.
The highest prize in theoretical physics awarded by the Russian Academy of Sciences is named in his honour:
Landau Gold Medal

On 22 January 2019, Google celebrated what would have been Landau's 111th birthday with a Google doodle.

The Landau-Spitzer Award (American Physical Society), which recognizes outstanding contributions to plasma physics and European-United States collaboration, is named in-part in his honor.

Landau's ranking of physicists

Landau kept a list of names of physicists which he ranked on a logarithmic scale of productivity ranging from 0 to 5. The highest ranking, 0, was assigned to Isaac Newton. Albert Einstein was ranked 0.5. A rank of 1 was awarded to the founding fathers of quantum mechanics, Niels Bohr, Werner Heisenberg, Satyendra Nath Bose, Paul Dirac and Erwin Schrödinger, and others, while members of rank of 5 were deemed "pathologists". Landau ranked himself as a 2.5 but later promoted to a 2. David Mermin, writing about Landau, referred to the scale, and ranked himself in the fourth division, in the article "My Life with Landau: Homage of a 4.5 to a 2".

In popular culture
 The Russian television film My Husband – the Genius (translation of the Russian title Мой муж – гений) released in 2008 tells the biography of Landau (played by Daniil Spivakovsky), mostly focusing on his private life. It was generally panned by critics.  People who had personally met Landau, including famous Russian scientist Vitaly Ginzburg, said that the film was not only terrible but also false in historical facts.
 Another film about Landau, Dau, is directed by Ilya Khrzhanovsky with non-professional actor Teodor Currentzis (an orchestra conductor) as Landau. Dau was a common nickname of Lev Landau.

Works

Landau wrote his first paper On the derivation of Klein–Fock equation, co-authored with Dmitri Ivanenko in 1926, when he was 18 years old. His last paper titled Fundamental problems appeared in 1960 in an edited version of tributes to Wolfgang Pauli. A complete list of Landau's works appeared in 1998 in the Russian journal Physics-Uspekhi. Landau would allow himself to be listed as a co-author of a journal article on two conditions: 1) he brought up the idea of the work, partly or entirely, and 2) he performed at least some calculations presented in the article. Consequently, he removed his name from numerous publications of his students where his contribution was less significant.

Course of Theoretical Physics

 — 2nd ed. (1965) at archive.org

Landau and Lifshitz suggested in the third volume of the Course of Theoretical Physics that the then-standard periodic table had a mistake in it, and that lutetium should be regarded as a d-block rather than an f-block element. Their suggestion was fully vindicated by later findings, and in 1988 was endorsed by a report of the International Union of Pure and Applied Chemistry (IUPAC).

Other

 in 4 volumes:  volume 1 Physical bodies ; volume 2 Molecules ; volume 3 Electrons and volume 4 Photons and nuclei; vols. 3 & 4 by Kitaigorodsky alone

See also
 List of Jewish Nobel laureates
 List of things named after Lev Landau

References

Further reading
Books
 (After Landau's 1962 car accident, the physics community around him rallied to attempt to save his life. They managed to prolong his life until 1968.)

Articles
 Karl Hufbauer, "Landau's youthful sallies into stellar theory: Their origins, claims, and receptions", Historical Studies in the Physical and Biological Sciences, 37 (2007), 337–354.
 "As a student, Landau dared to correct Einstein in a lecture". Global Talent News.
 
 Lev Davidovich Landau. Nobel-Winners.
 Landau's Theoretical Minimum, Landau's Seminar, ITEP in the Beginning of the 1950s by Boris L. Ioffe, Concluding talk at the workshop QCD at the Threshold of the Fourth Decade/Ioeffest.
  EJTP Landau Issue 2008.
 Ammar Sakaji and Ignazio Licata (eds), Lev Davidovich Landau and his Impact on Contemporary Theoretical Physics, Nova Science Publishers, New York, 2009, .
 Gennady Gorelik, "The Top Secret Life of Lev Landau", Scientific American, Aug. 1997, vol. 277(2), 53–57, JSTOR link.
 Maya Bessarab, "Landau's Life Pages(in Russian)".

External links

 

Lev Landau
1908 births
1968 deaths
Nobel laureates in Physics
Soviet Nobel laureates
Azerbaijani Jews
Scientists from Baku
Burials at Novodevichy Cemetery
Fluid dynamicists
Foreign associates of the National Academy of Sciences
Foreign Members of the Royal Society
Full Members of the USSR Academy of Sciences
Heroes of Socialist Labour
Jewish atheists
Jewish physicists
Lenin Prize winners
Members of the German Academy of Sciences Leopoldina
Academic staff of Moscow State University
Academic staff of the Moscow Institute of Physics and Technology
People from Baku Governorate
Recipients of the Order of Lenin
Saint Petersburg State University alumni
Soviet atheists
Soviet inventors
Soviet Jews
Soviet physicists
Stalin Prize winners
Theoretical physicists
Academic staff of the National University of Kharkiv
Winners of the Max Planck Medal
Superfluidity
People involved with the periodic table